Bi Bi Gol Mordeh-ye Sofla (also Romanized as Bī Bī Gol Mordeh-ye Soflá) is a village in Holayjan Rural District, in the Central District of Izeh County, Khuzestan Province, Iran. At the 2006 census, its population was 32, in 8 families.

References 

Populated places in Izeh County